Monique L. Midgette is a singer and actress. She has twice been nominated for a Helen Hayes Award and she has had roles in the Broadway plays The Civil War, Marie Christine, Seussical the Musical, and House of Flowers.

Awards and commendations
 nominated for a Helen Hayes Award in 1996 for Beehive
 nominated for a Helen Hayes Award in 2008 for The Women of Brewster Place

Discography
 Willy Wonka (Original Cast Recording by Cast of Roald Dahl's Willy Wonka, 2004)
 Eagle Song (Cast Recording)

References

Living people
American women singers
American musical theatre actresses
Year of birth missing (living people)
21st-century American women